The Command are a Women's Professional Lacrosse League (WPLL) professional women's field lacrosse team.  They have played in the WPLL since the 2018 season.  In the 2018 season, the five teams in the WPLL played in a barnstorming format, with all five teams playing at a single venue, and the Command were the inaugural champions.

Roster

2018 season

2019 season

See also

References

2018 establishments in Massachusetts
Lacrosse clubs established in 2018
Lacrosse teams in Boston
Women's Professional Lacrosse League
Women's sports in Massachusetts
Women in Boston